YB Datuk Annuar Ayub @ Banand (also known as Datuk Annuar Ayub Aman, Abbreviation AAA) is the Sabah State Assemblyman for the Liawan constituency, replacing Rasinin Kautis after winning the seat in the 2020 Sabah state election.

References 

Living people
Year of birth missing (living people)